Castell-Remlingen was a County located in the region of Franconia in northern Bavaria, Germany, ruled by a branch of the Counts of Castell. It was created as a partition of Castell in 1597, and in 1668 it was partitioned between itself and Castell-Castell. It was annexed to Castell in 1762.

Counts of Castell-Remlingen (1597 - 1762)
Wolfgang II (1597 - 1631) 
Wolfgang George I (1631 - 1668)
Frederick Magnus (1668 - 1717) - shared power with his brother Wolfgang Dietrich of Castell-Remlingen (1641–1709)
Charles Frederick Gottlieb (Count of Castell-Castell) (1717 - 1743) - shared power with his brothers Louis Frederick of Castell-Remlingen (1707–1772), Wolfgang George II of Castell Remlingen (1694-1735) and Augustus Franz Frederick of Castell-Remlingen (1705–1767)
Christian Adolph Frederick (Count of Castell) (1743 - 1762)
Christian Friedrich Carl of Castell-Remlingen (1730–1773)

Counties of the Holy Roman Empire
States and territories established in 1597